Weilheim is an electoral constituency (German: Wahlkreis) represented in the Bundestag. It elects one member via first-past-the-post voting. Under the current constituency numbering system, it is designated as constituency 226. It is located in southwestern Bavaria, comprising the districts of Garmisch-Partenkirchen and Weilheim-Schongau.

Weilheim was created for the inaugural 1949 federal election. Since 2002, it has been represented by Alexander Dobrindt of the Christian Social Union (CSU).

Geography
Weilheim is located in southern Bavaria. As of the 2021 federal election, it comprises the districts of Garmisch-Partenkirchen and Weilheim-Schongau.

History
Weilheim was created in 1949. In the 1949 election, it was Bavaria constituency 12 in the numbering system. In the 1953 through 1961 elections, it was number 207. In the 1965 through 1998 elections, it was number 212. In the 2002 and 2005 elections, it was number 227. Since the 2009 election, it has been number 226.

Originally, the constituency comprised the districts of Bad Tölz, Garmisch-Partenkirchen, Schongau, and Weilheim. In the 1976 election, it comprised the districts of Bad Tölz-Wolfratshausen, Garmisch-Partenkirchen, and Weilheim-Schongau. In the 1980 through 2013 elections, it comprised the districts of Garmisch-Partenkirchen, Landsberg, and Weilheim-Schongau. It acquired its current borders in the 2017 election.

Members
Like most constituencies in rural Bavaria, it is an CSU safe seat, the party holding the seat continuously since its creation. It was first represented by long-time CSU leader Franz Josef Strauss from 1949 to 1987, a total of ten consecutive terms; however, he resigned from the Bundestag in 1978 to become Minister-President of Bavaria, and subsequently turned down his Bundestag mandate after the 1980 and 1983 elections. He was succeeded by Michaela Geiger, who was representative from 1987 to 2002. Alexander Dobrindt was elected in 2002, and re-elected in 2005, 2009, 2013, 2017, and 2021.

Election results

2021 election

2017 election

2013 election

2009 election

References

Federal electoral districts in Bavaria
1949 establishments in West Germany
Constituencies established in 1949
Garmisch-Partenkirchen (district)
Weilheim-Schongau